The Murray Region Hydroelectric Power Stations refers to two of the original seven hydroelectric power stations, both located near the town of Khancoban in the Snowy Mountains region of New South Wales, Australia. The two power stations are part of the Snowy Mountains Scheme, a vast hydroelectricity and irrigation complex constructed in south-east Australia between 1949 and 1974 and now run by Snowy Hydro. Although both power stations are physically located in New South Wales, since 1 July 2008 all power generated has been allocated to the Victorian region of the National Electricity Market. The stations are not located on the Murray River.

Stations

Murray 1 Station
The power station was completed in 1967, and has  rated head. Fed by natural inflow, supplemented by the pumped flows of the Snowy-Geehi Haupt tunnel from Island Bend Pondage, it receives water from the Geehi Reservoir on the Geehi River and discharges into the Murray 2 Pondage. The station is capable of producing enough electricity to supply over 95,000 homes.

Murray 1 will undergo a series of outages, from 2013 to 2022 inclusive, in order to complete maintenance on each turbine and generator.

Murray 1 Power Station Lookout is located opposite Murray 1 Hydroelectric Power Station across Khancoban Back Creek, 8 km south-east on the Alpine Way from the Snowy Hydro Visitor Centre in association with Khancoban Visitor Centre.

Murray 2 Power Station
This site was the first use of Japanese supply of large electrical and mechanical components in the Snowy Scheme. The power station was completed in 1969, and has  rated head. Fed by the water discharged from Murray 1 Power Station into the Murray Two Pondage, Murray 2 Power Station discharges water into the Khancoban Pondage, and into the Swampy Plain River.

Murray 2 will undergo a series of outages, during 2020 to 2022 inclusive, in order to complete maintenance on two of the turbines and generators.

Gallery

See also

 List of power stations in New South Wales

References 

Snowy Mountains Scheme
Snowy Mountains